The Lake Solitude Trail is a  long hiking trail in Grand Teton National Park in the U.S. state of Wyoming. The trail begins at the Forks of Cascade Canyon and follows Cascade Creek up through North Cascade Canyon to Lake Solitude. Beyond Lake Solitude, the trail becomes steep and climbs to Paintbrush Divide where it ends at the Paintbrush Canyon Trail. The only way to access the trail is by way of either the Paintbrush Canyon or Cascade Canyon Trails. Except at and above Lake Solitude, backcountry camping is allowed with a permit along the trail.
loop hike which runs through both Cascade and Paintbrush Canyons.

See also
List of hiking trails in Grand Teton National Park

References

Hiking trails of Grand Teton National Park